The Jackson, later Duckett Baronetcy, of Hartham House in the County of Wiltshire, was a title in the Baronetage of Great Britain. It was created on 21 June 1791 for the naval administrator and politician George Jackson. He married as his second wife Grace Duckett, daughter of George Duckett, a landowner seated at Hartham. In 1797 he assumed by Royal licence the surname of Duckett in lieu of Jackson according to the will of Grace's uncle, Thomas Duckett. He was succeeded by his son by his second wife, the second Baronet, who represented Lymington and Plympton Erle in Parliament. The title became extinct on the death of the third Baronet in 1902, also named George, who made a career as an army officer, antiquarian and lexicographer.

Jackson, later Duckett baronets, of Hartham House (1791)
Sir George Duckett, 1st Baronet (1725–1822)
Sir George Duckett, 2nd Baronet (1777–1856)
Sir George Floyd Duckett, 3rd Baronet (1811–1902)

References

Extinct baronetcies in the Baronetage of Great Britain